Wrapping may refer to:

Buddy wrapping, the act of bandaging a damaged (particularly a fractured) finger or toe together with a healthy one
Overwrap, a wrapping of items in a package of a wrapping over packaging
Wrapping (graphics), the process of limiting a position to an area in computer graphics
Wrapping (overflow), a variable that exceeds its maximum value in computing
Wrapping paper, paper used for wrapping a gift
"Wrapping", an episode of the television series Teletubbies
Window capping or wrapping, the covering of wooden trim on buildings with aluminum or vinyl.

See also
Mandrel wrapping, a technique used to modify the modal distribution of a propagating optical signal in multimode fiber optics
Toilet papering, a victim's property is covered with toilet paper
Rapping
Wrap (disambiguation)